Angus Strathie is an Australian costume designer.

Biography
Angus Strathie has had a long professional career in costume design. A friend and longtime colleague of Baz Luhrmann and Catherine Martin, one of his earliest projects was the cult favourite Strictly Ballroom, a romantic comedy produced in 1992. Strathie went on to design the costumes for a TV production of the famous Puccini opera La Boheme before his work on the famous Moulin Rouge! an achievement that won him an Oscar in 2001 for Best Costume Design.

The catsuit, in Catwoman 2004, was designed by Academy Award-winning costume designer Angus Strathie together with Halle Berry, director Pitof, and the producers. Strathie explained, "We wanted a very reality-based wardrobe to show the progression from demure, repressed Patience to the sensual awakening of a sexy warrior goddess."

References

External links 

Australian costume designers
Living people
Year of birth missing (living people)
Best Costume Design Academy Award winners
Best Costume Design BAFTA Award winners